Melvyn Pejic (born 27 April 1959) is an English former footballer who played in the Football League for Hereford United, Stoke City and Wrexham. His brother Mike was also a professional footballer as well as his son Shaun.

Playing career
Pejic was born in Chesterton and joined the youth teams of Stoke City in 1977 where his older brother Mike had just spent ten years. He made just one first team appearance for Stoke which came against Ipswich Town on 12 January 1980, he played at right back as Stoke lost 1–0.

He signed for Hereford United where he spent the majority of his footballing career. A serious knee ligament injury hampered his first two seasons at Edgar Street. However, in the next four seasons he missed only five matches and was voted Player of the Year for three successive seasons in 1983, 1984 and 1985. He later became the only Hereford United Captain to lifted the Welsh Cup in 1990 when Hereford defeated Wrexham at Cardiff Arms Park.

In a 12-season stint, he made 523 competitive appearances, scoring 24 goals. Of these, 412 were in league matches, for which he holds the clubs Football League appearances record, where he also scored 14 goals, and puts him second in the all-time appearance list for the "Bulls", behind John Layton who played a total 549 times for the club during their non-league days. He moved to Wrexham midway through the 1991–92 season, and went on to make over 100 league appearances for the "Red Dragons" helping the Welsh side to gain promotion in 1992–93.

Post-retirement
Towards the end of his playing days he firstly completed his FA Diploma in the Treatment and Management of Injuries, before studying and gaining a Physiotherapy Degree from Salford University, later taking over first physio duties at Wrexham and then under the managership of John Toshack the Wales national football team senior physiotherapists position, being promoted from a similar position with the Under 21 team.

In August 2012, after three years as physiotherapist with Bolton Wanderers, Pejic joined Macclesfield Town. In November 2013 Pejic returned to Stoke City to work in the medical department at the club's academy.

Personal life
One of Mel's sons, Shaun also played for Wrexham, and his elder brother Mike was also a footballer.

Career statistics
Source:

A.  The "Other" column constitutes appearances and goals in the Football League Trophy.

Honours
 Wrexham
 Third Division runner-up: 1992–93

References

1959 births
Living people
English footballers
Stoke City F.C. players
Hereford United F.C. players
Wrexham A.F.C. players
English people of Serbian descent
Association football physiotherapists
Wales national football team non-playing staff
Bolton Wanderers F.C. non-playing staff
Alumni of the University of Salford
People from Chesterton, Staffordshire
English Football League players
Macclesfield Town F.C. non-playing staff
Stoke City F.C. non-playing staff
Association football defenders